Octavian Morariu (born 7 August 1961) is a Romanian former rugby union player and coach, and is currently the President of Rugby Europe.

He is the son of former Romania rugby union international Viorel Morariu and Cornelia Timoșanu a former volleyball player for Romania, which finished second at the 1956 FIVB Volleyball World Championship in France. Morariu played as a Number Eight for Rugby Club Grivița Roșie as a youth. He played in France for ASPTT Paris and was also invited to play for the Barbarians. He earned 2 caps for Romania, from 1984 to 1985 without scoring.

From 2001 to 2003, Morariu was president of the Romanian Rugby Federation, and from 2004 to 2014 president of the Romanian Olympic and Sports Committee. Since 2013, Morariu has served as the President of Rugby Europe, the governing body for rugby union in Europe. He was unanimously reelected for a second term in 2016.

In 2013, Morariu became a member of the International Olympic Committee (IOC), he was a member of the International Relations Commission from 2014-2015 an is since 2015, a member of the Public Affairs and Social Development through Sport Commission.

Orders
Chevalier of the Ordre national du Mérite: 2014

References

External links

1961 births
Living people
Sportspeople from Bucharest
Romanian rugby union players
Romanian rugby union coaches
Romania international rugby union players
Romanian expatriate sportspeople in France
Barbarian F.C. players
Rugby union number eights
Rugby union players from Bucharest
Engineers from Bucharest
International Olympic Committee members
Knights of the Ordre national du Mérite
Presidents of the Romanian Olympic and Sports Committee
Presidents of the Romanian Rugby Federation